Hugo Botstiber (21 April 1875 in Vienna – 15 January 1941 in Shrewsbury, UK) was an Austrian Jewish musicologist, who studied under Robert Fuchs and Guido Adler. He was the secretary general of the Wiener Konzerthaus. In 1938, he left Nazi Austria.

Literary works 
 Beethoven im Alltag, 1927;
 J. Haydn, 1927 (the 3rd volume for the work of Carl Ferdinand Pohl, based on the notes of him);
 He revised the "Musikbuch aus Österreich" between 1904 and 1911;

External links 
 Botstiber, Hugo at aeiou.iicm.tugraz.at
 BOTSTIBER, Hugo at ezines.onb.ac.at:8080

Austrian musicologists
Jewish emigrants from Austria to the United Kingdom after the Anschluss
Writers from Vienna
1875 births
1941 deaths